OTE is the national telecommunications provider of Greece.

OTE may also refer to:
 Ocean thermal energy conversion, a renewable energy source
 Oda of Haldensleben (978–1023), daughter of the Margrave of the North March, Theoderich
 On-target earnings, a feature in some job adverts
 Operational Test and Evaluation (OT&E), as in the U.S. Operational Test and Evaluation Directorate
 Optical Telescope Element, a sub-section of the planned James Webb Space Telescope
 Ordinary Time Earnings, the basis used to determine mandatory employer superannuation contributions in Australia

See also
 Over the Edge (disambiguation)